This is a list of units of the Finnish Air Force during the Continuation War:

Flying Regiment 1
Tiedustelulentolaivue 12
Hävittäjälentolaivue 32

Flying Regiment 2
Tiedustelulentolaivue 16
Hävittäjälentolaivue 28

Flying Regiment 3
Hävittäjälentolaivue 24
Hävittäjälentolaivue 26
Hävittäjälentolaivue 34

Flying Regiment 4
Pommituslentolaivue 42
Pommituslentolaivue 44
Pommituslentolaivue 46
Pommituslentolaivue 48

Flying Regiment 5
Tiedustelulentolaivue 14
Pommituslentolaivue 6
Hävittäjälentolaivue 30

Other units
Täydennyslentolaivue 17
Täydennyslentolaivue 35
Ilmasotakoulu
Koelentolaivue
Koelaivue
Lentovarikko 1
Lentovarikko 2

See also
List of units of the Finnish Air Force during the Winter War

Finnish Air Force
Continuation War